Ports of Call is a 1998 science fiction adventure novel by American writer Jack Vance. Followed by the novel Lurulu, it tells the story of a young man named Myron Tany on a picaresque journey through the Gaean Reach.

Plot summary
Myron's family intended for Myron to follow a staid and respectable career in economics; however, when his wealthy and eccentric great-aunt Dame Hester came into possession of a space yacht, Myron suddenly found his long suppressed dreams of adventure within reach. Serving as Dame Hester's nominal captain on her journey to find a clinic reputed to restore lost youth to wealthy clients, Myron soon finds that his aunt is capricious as she is flamboyant, and after an argument, finds himself castaway on a remote planet. With no resources to return home, he obtains the position of supercargo on a tramp freighter, which enables him to travel further across the Gaean Reach to exotic lands.

Reception
F&SF reviewer Elizabeth Hand praised Ports of Call as "delightful," declaring that "one enjoys Ports of Call as one does a Restoration comedy, for the sheer outrageous of its characters and the precision of Vance's often lunatic descriptive powers."

References

External links
 

1998 American novels
Novels by Jack Vance
Novels set on fictional planets
1998 science fiction novels
American science fiction novels
Picaresque novels